Cyclam (1,4,8,11-tetraazacyclotetradecane) is an organic compound with the formula (NHCH2CH2NHCH2CH2CH2)2. Classified as an aza-crown ether, it is a white solid that is soluble in water. As a macrocyclic ligand, it binds strongly to many transition metal cations. The compound was first prepared by the reaction of 1,3-dibromopropane and ethylenediamine.

The compound features four secondary amines.  Its complexes therefore can exist as several diastereomers, depending on the relative orientation of the N–H centres. Its complexes feature alternating five- and six-membered chelate rings.  The closely related ligand cyclen ((CH2CH2NH)4) forms only five-membered C2N2M chelate rings and tends not to form square-planar complexes.

N-Alkyl derivatives
Metal-cyclam complexes are prone to oxidative degradation, which is initiated by deprotonation of the secondary amine.  This flaw led to the development of cyclam derivatives wherein the NH centres are replaced by tertiary amines.  For example, the tetramethyl derivatives are readily prepared by methylation using formaldehyde and formic acid. These oxidatively robust derivatives of cyclam have enabled a number of metal–O2 complexes.

See also
 Sarcophagine
 Plerixafor

References

Nitrogen heterocycles
Secondary amines
Macrocycles
Polyamines
Chelating agents